Oru Kai Osai is a 1980 Indian Tamil-language film, written and directed by K. Bhagyaraj. It was released on 25 July 1980. This film created an impact and was well received by the audience for its unique characterisation and unexpected climax. The film was remade in Telugu as Pranaya Geetham (1981).

Plot 
Ashwini is a doctor who enters the Siruvallur village  to lead a peaceful life. She sees Bhagyaraj at different instances trying to attempt suicide. Bhagyaraj, during his childhood, had lost his voice by seeing his mother drowning and losing her life while crossing a flooded river. Due to his disability, he thinks that life has no meaning for him any more, which becomes the reason for his multiple suicide attempts. Ashwini, as a doctor, gives basic treatment to Bhagyaraj, which eventually leads to Bhagyaraj falling in love with her. Bhagyaraj also has a relative, Ponni, who has a crush on him irrespective of his disability. When Ponni decides to express her love to Bhagyaraj, she learns that he is already in love with Ashwini. She leaves her love aside and decides not to express her love to him any more.

One fine day, Ashwini's daughter and her brother arrives to the village to stay with her. Ashwini actually used to have a lover who was killed in a train accident before their marriage. The little girl, i.e., Ashwini's daughter gets attached to Bhagyaraj. Ashwini's cousin brother and Ponni get attracted to each other as well. After a point of time, Bhagyaraj is separated from his village and stays on the other side of the river for seven days as he had fought with his fellow villagers. During that time, he sees Ashwini's daughter attempting to cross the flooding river to see him. He gets into the river and shouts at her to not come towards him. By doing so, he regains his voice as before. After getting back his voice, he decides to talk Ashwini before talking to anyone. Meanwhile, Ashwini decides to marry Bhagyaraj as she feels that Bhagyaraj would be a good father to her daughter. On their marriage day, Ashwini sees her 'dead' lover as one of the marriage attendees. It is revealed that he did not die. He had been was pickpocketed by a thief, who was the one who died, and seeing the wallet, he was believed to be the one who died.

Finally, Bhagyaraj decides to unite Ashwini with her lover, and Ponni with Ashwini's cousin, and they get married. Bhagyaraj remains unmarried and acts like he is dumb until the end.

Cast 
K. Bhagyaraj
Ashwini as Doctor
Sangili Murugan as Sangili
K. K. Soundar
Kovai Senthil
Kallapetti Singaram as Tea shop owner

Production 
Oru Kai Osai is Bhagyaraj's second film as director. It is the debut film for Kovai Senthil. The main theme of the film is casteism, which Bhagyaraj based on his experiences in Vellankovil, Gobichettipalayam. The doctor character played by Ashwini was partially inspired by Bhagyaraj's mother.

Soundtrack 
The music composed by M. S. Viswanathan, while lyrics written by Muthulingam, Chidambaranathan, Viswam and Bairavi. The song "Muthuthaaragai" is set in the Carnatic raga Charukesi.

Release and reception 
Oru Kai Osai was released on 25 July 1980. Kanthan of Kalki lauded Bhagyaraj's performance as a mute man, but played on the film's title by calling it "oru pakkam vendha dosai" (dosa fried on only one side).

References

External links 
 
 

1980 drama films
1980 films
1980s Tamil-language films
Films about the caste system in India
Films directed by K. Bhagyaraj
Films scored by M. S. Viswanathan
Indian drama films
Tamil films remade in other languages